Mao Chi-kuo (born 4 October 1948 in Fenghua, Zhejiang) is a Taiwanese politician, who served as the Premier, the President of Executive Yuan from 2014 to 2016.

Early life 
Mao was born on 4 October 1948, in Fenghua, Zhejiang Province. Mao obtained his bachelor's degree in civil engineering from the National Cheng Kung University in Tainan in 1971. He obtained his Master's of Engineering in Community and Regional Development from the Asian Institute of Technology in Thailand in 1975, then his Ph.D. in civil engineering from the Massachusetts Institute of Technology in United States in 1982.

Academic career 
In 1982-1987, Mao was the Associate Professor, Professor and Director at the National Chiao Tung University (NCTU) in Hsinchu City. In 2003-2006, he became the Chair Professor of the College of Management of NCTU, and become the college's Dean and Professor in 2006-2008.

Political career 
Mao's first service at the Ministry of Transportation and Communications was as the Administrative Deputy Minister under President Lee Teng-hui from 1993 until 2000.

He served as the Minister of Transportation and Communications in the Republic of China under the administration of President Ma Ying-jeou from 2008 until 2013.

Speaking at the completion ceremony in Kinmen of the first cross-strait submarine communication cable linking Kinmen and Xiamen in August 2012, Mao said that the undersea cable will ease the construction of any future cross-strait cable projects.

See also 

 List of premiers of the Republic of China
 List of vice premiers of the Republic of China

References

External links 
 Vice Premier

|-

1948 births
Asian Institute of Technology alumni
Kuomintang politicians in Taiwan
Living people
MIT School of Engineering alumni
Politicians from Ningbo
Premiers of the Republic of China on Taiwan
Republic of China politicians from Zhejiang
20th-century Taiwanese economists
Taiwanese Ministers of Transportation and Communications
Taiwanese people from Zhejiang